Crime and Punishment is a 1956 French crime film based on the eponymous 1866 novel by Fyodor Dostoyevsky.

Plot
Proud of his position in society and of his intelligence, René Brunel believes that bourgeois notions of morality do no apply to him. To prove his point he murders an old woman in cold blood.

Cast
 Jean Gabin as Le commissaire Gallet
 Marina Vlady as Lili Marcellin
 Ulla Jacobsson as Nicole Brunel
 Bernard Blier as Antoine Monestier
 Robert Hossein as René Brunel 
 Gaby Morlay as Madame Brunel (as Madame Gaby Morlay)
 René Havard as L'inspecteur Noblet
 Yvette Etiévant as Madame Marcelini (as Yvette Etievant)
 Gabrielle Fontan as Madame Harvais
 Roland Lesaffre as L'ouvrier accusé
 Albert Rémy as L'inspecteur Renaud
 Lino Ventura as Gustave Messonnier
 Gérard Blain as Jean Fargeot
 Julien Carette as Pierre Marcellin

References

External links

1956 crime films
1956 films
Films based on Crime and Punishment
French crime films
French black-and-white films
1950s French films